Maria R. Gervais is a United States Army lieutenant general who serves as the deputy commanding general and chief of staff of the United States Army Training and Doctrine Command (TRADOC). She previously served as the Director of the Synthetic Training Environment Cross Functional Team, United States Army Futures Command, and the Deputy Commanding General of the United States Army Combined Arms Center.

Gervais assumed her current assignment with a promotion to lieutenant general on June 20, 2021, date of rank May 28, 2021.

References

Living people
Place of birth missing (living people)
Recipients of the Distinguished Service Medal (US Army)
Recipients of the Legion of Merit
United States Army generals
United States Army personnel of the Gulf War
United States Army personnel of the Iraq War
Year of birth missing (living people)